Queer Creek is a stream in Sanders County, Montana, in the United States. It is a tributary to the Vermilion River.

See also

List of rivers of Montana

References

Rivers of Sanders County, Montana
Rivers of Montana